Sordid may refer to:

 Paul Sordid (20th century), English drummer
 Sordid (character), a fictional character in the Simon the Sorcerer series of video games